V Deep is the Boomtown Rats's fifth album, and the first to be released as a five-piece band, following the departure of guitarist Gerry Cott. It includes the minor hit single "House on Fire".

Name
The name of the album is pronounced "five deep", not "vee deep" referring to the roman numeral 5. It refers to the fact that it is the band's fifth album and also that they became a five-piece following the departure of Gerry Cott.

Track listing

UK release
All songs were written by Bob Geldof, except where noted.
 "Never in a Million Years"
 "The Bitter End"
 "Talking in Code"
 "He Watches It All"
 "A Storm Breaks"
 "Charmed Lives"
 "House on Fire"
 "Up All Night"
 "Skin on Skin"
 "The Little Death/... House Burned Down" (Geldof, Pete Briquette)

US release
All songs were written by Bob Geldof, except where noted.
 "Never in a Million Years"
 "The Bitter End"
 "Talking in Code"
 "He Watches It All"
 "A Storm Breaks"
 "Charmed Lives"
 "House on Fire"
 "Whitehall 1212" (from the UK Mondo Bongo)
 "Skin on Skin"
 "The Little Death/... House Burned Down" (Geldof, Pete Briquette)

2005 reissue
All songs were written by Bob Geldof, except where noted.
 "He Watches It All"
 "Never in a Million Years"
 "Talking in Code"
 "The Bitter End"
 "The Little Death" (Geldof, Pete Briquette)
 "A Storm Breaks"
 "Up All Night"
 "House on Fire"
 "Charmed Lives"
 "Skin on Skin"
 "Say Hi to Mick"
 "No Hiding Place" (B-side)
 "House on Fire" (12" Dub Version)
 "Up All Night" (Long Version)

Personnel
The Boomtown Rats
 Bob Geldof – vocals, saxophone
 Pete Briquette – bass, vocals
 Johnnie Fingers – keyboards, vocals
 Simon Crowe – drums, vocals
 Garry Roberts – guitar, vocals
with:
Andy Duncan - percussion
Andy Hamilton, Dave McHale - saxophone
Guy Barker - trumpet
Spike Edney - trombone
Technical
Andy Le Vien, Corinne Simcock - engineer
Gordon Fordyce - remixing
Ben Kelly - cover, design
Jon Prew - photography

References

The Boomtown Rats albums
1982 albums
Albums produced by Tony Visconti